A groomsman or usher is one of the male attendants to the groom in a wedding ceremony and performs the first speech at the wedding. Usually, the groom selects close friends and relatives to serve as groomsmen, and it is considered an honor to be selected. From his groomsmen, the groom usually chooses one to serve as best man.

For a wedding with many guests, the groom may also ask other male friends and relatives to act as ushers without otherwise participating in the wedding ceremony; their sole task is ushering guests to their seats before the ceremony. Ushers may also be hired for very large weddings.

In a military officer's wedding, the roles of groomsmen are replaced by swordsmen of the sword honor guard. They are usually picked as close personal friends of the groom who have served with him. Their role includes forming the traditional saber arch for the married couple and guests to walk through.

The first recorded use of the word ‘groomsmen’, according to the Oxford English Dictionary, was as recently as 1698, although the words ‘bride’ and ‘groom’ both date back to Old English.

Duties

The most visible duty of the groomsmen is helping guests find their places before the ceremony and to stand near the groom during the wedding ceremony.

Additionally, the groom may request other kinds of assistance, such as planning celebratory events such as a bachelor party, also called a stag-do or buck's night; helping make the wedding pleasant for guests by talking with people who are alone or dancing with unaccompanied guests or bridesmaids, if there is dancing at a wedding reception; or providing practical assistance with gifts, luggage, or unexpected complications.  Groomsmen may also participate in local or regional traditions, such as decorating the newlywed couple's car.

Bridegroom-men formerly had important duties. The men were called bride-knights, and represented a survival of the primitive days of marriage by capture, when a man called his friends in to assist to "lift" or kidnap the bride, or from the need to defend the bride from would-be kidnappers.

Best man

The best man is the chief assistant to the groom at a wedding. While the role is older, the earliest surviving written use of the term best man comes from 1782, observing that "best man and best maid" in the Scottish dialect are equivalent to "bride-man and bride-maid" in England.

In most modern Anglophone countries, the groom extends this honor to someone who is close to him, generally a close friend or a relative (such as a sibling or cousin). During a wedding ceremony the best man stands next to the groom, slightly behind him. This means that the four people present at the altar are the officiant (such as a civil celebrant, priest, rabbi, minister, or other religious figure), the bride, groom, and best man. This is common in some western countries, although in others the best man and bridesmaid participate on an equal footing.

While the best man's required duties are only those of a friend, in the context of a western white wedding, the best man will typically:
Assist the groom on the wedding day,
 Organise a stag-do, 
Be in charge of the ushers
Keep the wedding rings safe until needed during the ceremony,
Stand next to the groom during the ceremony,
Act as a legal witness to the marriage and therefore sign the marriage certificate, and
Prepare a "best man's speech" to be read at the reception

In various countries and cultures

The best man is not a universal custom. Even in places where a best man is customary, the role may be quite different when compared to other areas of the world.
 In the Anglosphere, it is traditional for the best man to give a short speech.
 In Zambia, a best man is expected to lead processions both at the wedding, and at preliminary events. This includes pre-wedding dance rehearsals, at which the best man is always expected to be in attendance, and usually is expected to give an outstanding and outlandish dance-performance on the actual wedding-day.
 In Uganda, a best man is expected to guide the newlyweds in the ways of marriage. This means that ideally a best man must be married, preferably to one wife, and should be in position to give sound, tried and tested advice. A best man must be a confidant and be discreet about the details he shares with the new couple. 
 In Bhutan, the best man presents himself at the wedding as a ceremonial guardian to both bride and groom. Thereafter he entertains the guests, sometimes for several hours. 
 In Eastern Orthodox weddings in Greece, the best man is often also the koumbaros, or religious sponsor. The koumbaros (or koumbara, if a woman) is an honored participant who crowns the couple and participates in circling the altar three times. Sometimes, this person also pays for most of the wedding expenses.
 In Ukraine, a best man is responsible for guarding the bride during the wedding festivities. When he or the groom steps away, the bride gets "kidnapped" or has a shoe stolen. Then the groom or the best man must pay a ransom in exchange for returning the bride, usually by paying money (which is given to the bride) or by doing something embarrassing.

Bachelor party

In the past, the bachelor party was typically scheduled for a convenient evening during the week before the wedding. A type of farewell dinner, it was always hosted, and therefore organized and paid for, entirely by the groom.  The dinner was seen as the groom's last chance to entertain his friends as a single man; after the wedding, dinner parties at his home would always be presided over by his wife in her role as hostess.

Common slang names for this event are bachelor party, stag do, or bucks' night in different parts of the world. In many areas, this dinner is now most commonly organized by the best man; the costs can be shared by either all of the participants or all of the participants except for the groom, who becomes the guest of honor.

See also
Bridesman
Bridesmaid

References

Wedding ceremony participants